Carmen Campagne  (September 8, 1959 – July 4, 2018) was a Canadian singer and children's entertainer. She, along with Connie Kaldor, received a Juno Award at the 1989 Award ceremony in the category Best Children's Album for Lullaby Berceuse. A Fransaskois from Willow Bunch, Saskatchewan, she was a member of the folk music band Folle Avoine in the 1970s. Her brother Paul Campagne and sisters Suzanne Campagne, Michelle Campagne and Annette Campagne, her bandmates in Folle Avoine, have also continued in music with the folk band Hart-Rouge.

In 2013, she was made a Member of the Order of Canada "for her contributions as a singer, songwriter and composer enhancing music for young children and using music in French-language education".

Campagne died of cancer at age 58 on July 4, 2018, in Sainte-Agathe-des-Monts, Quebec.

References

1959 births
2018 deaths
Fransaskois people
Canadian children's musicians
Canadian women singers
Musicians from Saskatchewan
Juno Award for Children's Album of the Year winners
French-language singers of Canada
Members of the Order of Canada
Deaths from cancer in Saskatchewan